Rosters at the 2002 IIHF World Championship in Sweden.

Legend

Canada 

Head coach: Wayne Fleming

Skaters

Goaltenders

Source: IIHF.

Czech Republic 

Head coach: Josef Augusta

Skaters

Goaltenders

Source: IIHF.

Finland 

Head coach: Hannu Aravirta

Skaters

Goaltenders

Source: IIHF.

Russia

Head coach: Boris Mikhailov

Skaters

Goaltenders

Source: IIHF.

Slovakia 

Head coach: Ján Filc

Skaters

Goaltenders

Source: IIHF.

Sweden

Head coach: Hardy Nilsson

Skaters

Goaltenders
 
Source: IIHF.

United States

Head coach: Lou Vairo

Skaters

Goaltenders

Source: IIHF.

References

External links
 IIHF 2002 Championship

rosters
IIHF World Championship rosters